Artur Gagiki Vanetsyan (born 8 December 1979) is an Armenian politician who served as the director of the National Security Service of Armenia (2018–2019), president of Football Federation of Armenia (2018–2019), and is the founder and chairman of the center-right Homeland Party.

Political career
On November 11, after the Armenian defeat on the 2020 Nagorno-Karabakh war, he was arrested among other opposition leaders on charges of "illegal conduction of rallies". On November 13, they were freed after a Yerevan Court of General Jurisdiction deemed their arrests unlawful.

On November 14, he was detained again, this time by the National Security Service (which he headed between 2018 and 2019) on the suspicion of usurping power and preparing the assassination of Prime Minister Nikol Pashinyan. On November 15, he was freed again after the court declared the detention as unlawful.

Artur Vanetsyan was nominated to lead the I Have Honor Alliance in the 2021 Armenian parliamentary elections.

On 21 June 2022, Vanetsyan announced that he was withdrawing the Homeland Party from the I Have Honor alliance.

References

1979 births
Living people
Politicians from Yerevan
20th-century Armenian politicians
21st-century Armenian politicians
Armenian military personnel of the 2020 Nagorno-Karabakh war
Leaders of political parties in Armenia